The 2006 Northwestern Wildcats football team represented Northwestern University in the Big Ten Conference during the 2006 NCAA Division I FBS football season. Head coach Randy Walker died unexpectedly on June 29, 2006 of an apparent heart attack at the age of 52.  Pat Fitzgerald, seen by many before the tragedy as Walker's eventual successor, was promoted from linebackers coach and recruiting coordinator to head coach on July 7.  The Wildcats also had to replace their offensive coordinator, offensive line coach, and Brett Basanez, the team's former four-year starter at quarterback and holder of dozens of school records. The 2006 season was not as successful as previous years.

Northwestern began their season with a win at Miami, Walker's alma mater, in an emotional game that featured several tributes to the late coach.  However, the season went downhill from there.  The second game was a blowout loss to I-AA New Hampshire.  The low point of the season came on October 21 with a home loss to Michigan State in which the Spartans staged the largest comeback in Division I-A history.  A win against Illinois in the final game gave the Wildcats a 4–8 record for the year and saved them from finishing last in the Big Ten.  The high point of the season, despite coming in defeat, was Northwestern's close and competitive play against undefeated and #3 ranked Michigan.  Despite being held to -13 rushing yards, the Wildcats came within one-possession of tying the game early in the third quarter and prevented the Wolverines from scoring in the fourth quarter en route to a 17–3 final.

Schedule

Roster

References

Northwestern
Northwestern Wildcats football seasons
Northwestern Wildcats football